Puerto Rico Highway 106 (PR-106) is a road that travels from Mayagüez, Puerto Rico to Las Marías. It begins at its intersection with PR-239 (former PR-2R) in downtown Mayagüez and ends at its junction with PR-120 in southern Las Marías, near Maricao. Its eastern segment, from PR-119 to PR-120, is part of the Ruta Panorámica.

Major intersections

See also

 List of highways numbered 106

References

External links
 

106